Dacia Hotel, originally Pannonia Hotel (in ) located in Satu Mare (in ), present-day Romania, was built at the beginning of the 20th century, on the site of the previous town hall. The façade, generously embellished with plant motifs, is made from enamelled ceramic. 

The building was built in 1902 in Hungarian Secession style, based on plans drawn by architects Zoltán Bálint and Lajos Frommer. Initially named the Pannonia Hotel, it was renamed the Dacia Hotel after the Union of Transylvania with Romania in the wake of World War I. Being the most beautiful hotel in the city, notables such as Liviu Rebreanu, Mihail Sadoveanu, Nicolae Iorga, and Octavian Goga stayed here.

The hotel was nationalized by Communist Romania after World War II, and privatized in 1995, after the Romanian Revolution of 1989. In 2007, the Dacia Hotel was bought by Vasile Țânțaș for 1.7 million Euros.

References

Hotels in Satu Mare
Hotels in Romania
Buildings and structures in Satu Mare
History of Satu Mare
Historic monuments in Satu Mare County
Hotels established in 1902
Hotel buildings completed in 1902